WSP may refer to:

Organizations
 Washington State Patrol, the state police agency for the U.S. state of Washington
 Wasserschutzpolizei, the German water police
 Water and Sanitation Program, a trust fund administered by the World Bank geared at improving access to water and sanitation 
 Website Pros, now part of Web.com
 Women Strike for Peace, a United States women's peace activist group
 WSP Global, a Canadian-based management and consultancy services business, formerly the London-based WSP Group
 WSP New Zealand, formerly WSP Opus, a subsidiary of WSP Global

Technology and science
 Wandering salesman problem, in discrete optimization, similar to the travelling salesman problem
 Waste stabilization pond, a low-cost basic wastewater treatment process
 Water safety plan, for drinking water
 Web service provider, a provider of a method of communication between two electronic devices over a network
 Web service protocol, for example JSON-WSP
 Wireless Session Protocol, upper layer of the Wireless Application Protocol stack
 Wheel slide protection, used on rail vehicles
 Wireless Short-Packet; see EnOcean
 World Soundscape Project, an acoustic ecology research project

Places
 Wasco State Prison, a state prison in California, US
 Washington Square Park, public park in New York City
 Waspam Airport (IATA Code), Nicaragua
 Wetumpka State Penitentiary, a former prison in Alabama, US
 Wyoming State Penitentiary

Other uses
 Widespread Panic, an American jam band
 Wigan St Patricks, an amateur rugby league club based in Wigan, England

See also
 Wire strike protection system, for helicopters
 Windows Search Protocol (MS-WSP), a remote query protocol used in Microsoft File Explorer